The 2005 Formula BMW UK season was the second of four Formula BMW seasons based in United Kingdom for young drivers making the transition to car racing. The series supported every BTCC round apart from round three at Rockingham where it was part of a Kumho BMW and Miltek BMW event. Dean Smith won the championship at his second attempt with new team Nexa Racing after scoring in every round, his championship rival Sam Bird won six races but lost a lot of points with five DNFs during the season.

Teams and drivers
All cars were Mygale FB02 chassis powered by BMW engines. Guest drivers in italics.

Results and Standings

Calendar

Drivers Championship

Sources
 tsl-timing.com
 https://www.driverdb.com/championships/standings/formula-bmw-uk/2005/ driverdb.com

Formula BMW seasons
Formula BMW
BMW UK